Below is a list of satellites which have provided data on the Earth's magnetosphere.

Notes 
1γ = 10−5 oersted = Dynamic range of instrumentation

References 

Satellites which have provided data on the magnetosphere, List of
Satellites which have provided data on the magnetosphere, List of
Earth's magnetosphere